Steven Caldwell Thomas (born 3 October 1967) is an Australian politician. He is a Liberal member of the Western Australian Legislative Council, having represented South West Region since 2017, and has been the deputy leader of the party since January 2023. He was previously a member of the Western Australian Legislative Assembly from February 2005 to September 2008 representing the electorate of Capel.

Outside politics
Thomas was born in Mansfield, Victoria. Prior to entering politics Thomas was a veterinary surgeon and has a degree in veterinary science.

Legislative Assembly
On entering Parliament Thomas was appointed as acting speaker of the Legislative Assembly (lower house) in March 2005 and was a member of the Public Accounts Committee from April 2005.
Thomas was appointed as the shadow minister of the Environment for most of 2006 and from January 2008 acted as the shadow treasurer.

The seat of Capel was abolished and merged with Collie-Wellington and parts of Vasse into the new seat of Collie-Preston. Thomas contested the seat in the 2008 election and lost narrowly to Labor candidate and member for Collie-Wellington, Mick Murray.

Legislative Council
Thomas was elected at the 2017 election to represent South West Region in the Legislative Council (upper house), starting from 22 May 2017.

Thomas was elected as deputy party leader on 30 January 2023.

References

1967 births
Living people
Members of the Western Australian Legislative Assembly
Members of the Western Australian Legislative Council
Liberal Party of Australia members of the Parliament of Western Australia
21st-century Australian politicians